Thu Van Tran (born in Ho Chi Minh City, Vietnam, 1979) is an artist. She lives and works in Paris, France.

Works
Tran's work has been characterised by literature, architecture and history. Her birth country, Vietnam and her homeland France bring her to think and work with duality, inequality and instability as structural elements of her practice. Her work takes form of semantic or sculptural compositions that are placed in contemplative and discursive fields.

Tran has had solo exhibitions at Neuer Berliner Kunstverein and the Macleay Museum in Sydney.

References

External links
 Official website
 Thu Van Tran at Almine Rech, Paris reviewed in Art Forum, March 2020 by Lillian Davies

1979 births
Living people
21st-century women artists
Vietnamese women artists
People from Ho Chi Minh City
21st-century Vietnamese women